The Firm Gets Married (German:Die Firma heiratet) is a 1914 German silent comedy film directed by Carl Wilhelm and starring Ernst Lubitsch, Victor Arnold and Albert Paulig. It is also known by the alternative title of  The Perfect Thirty-Six. It was remade by Wilhelm as a sound film The Firm Gets Married in 1931.

Cast
 Victor Arnold as Hoflieferant Manfred Mayer  
 Ernst Lubitsch as Moritz Abramowski  
 Albert Paulig as Reisender Siegmund Philippsohn  
 Ressel Orla as Trude Hoppe 
 Hanns Kräly as Verkäufer  
 Alfred Kuehne 
 Anna Müller-Lincke as Tante Clara  
 Franz Schönemann as Konfektionär Werdenberg

References

Bibliography
 Elsaesser, Thomas. Weimar Cinema and After: Germany's Historical Imaginary. Routledge, 2013.

External links

1914 films
1914 comedy films
German comedy films
Films of the German Empire
Films directed by Carl Wilhelm
German silent feature films
German black-and-white films
Silent comedy films
1910s German films
1910s German-language films